Alan Berger is an American landscape architect and urban designer currently the Leventhal Professor of Advanced Urbanism at Massachusetts Institute of Technology and an Elected Fellow of the American Academy in Rome.

References

Year of birth missing (living people)
Living people
MIT School of Architecture and Planning faculty
21st-century American engineers
Place of birth missing (living people)